The Argus Leader is the daily newspaper of Sioux Falls, South Dakota. Owned by Gannett, it was the state's largest newspaper by total circulation until 2021 when it was surpassed by the Rapid City Journal, according to statistics from the South Dakota Newspaper Association.

Description

The Argus Leader is South Dakota's second-largest newspaper in total circulation, as of 2021. The weekday circulation for the newspaper was 23,721 as of October, 2017. The Sunday edition has a circulation of 32,981 as of October, 2017.

The associated website, ArgusLeader.com boasts most traffic and unique visitors in its market, according to Comscore.com's data.

The newspaper also publishes an economic weekly, the Sioux Falls Business Journal, as part of its Sunday publication. 

In 2011, the newspaper sought information about the federal food stamps program through a Freedom of Information Act request. The request was denied, and eight years later, the United States Supreme Court ruled in favor of the government by a 6–3 decision.

See also

List of newspapers in South Dakota

References

External links
Argus Leader website
Official mobile website
Brandon Valley Challenger
Dell Rapids Tribune
Sioux Falls Business Journal

Newspapers published in South Dakota
Mass media in Sioux Falls, South Dakota
Gannett publications
Publications established in 1881
1881 establishments in Dakota Territory